Groenlandibelidae is a family of coleoid cephalopods believed to belong to the spirulids.

Morphologically, its taxa seem to have some belemnoid characteristics, suggesting a possible intermediate relationship.

Genera

Groenlandibelus  Jeletzky, 1966 
Monospecific, Groenlandibelus rosenkrantzi Jeletzky, 1966 (Birkelund, 1956). The fossil range is from Campanian to Maastrichtian  Some material originally was ascribed to Belemnoteuthis before being allocated its own genus.

Cyrtobelus Fuchs et al 2012 
Some taxa now assigned to the Groenlandibelus are now assigned to Cyrtobelus.
Species:
 Cyrtobelus birkelundae Fuchs et al. 2012
 C. hornbyense Fuchs et al. 2012

The fossil range is from Upper Campanian to upper Maastrichtian
with localities in Vancouver Island (BC) and West Greenland

Naefia Wetzel, 1930 
The fossil range of Naefia is from Cenomanian to Campanian.

References 

Cenozoic cephalopods
Cephalopod orders
Coleoidea